SS John Barton Payne was a Liberty ship built in the United States during World War II. She was named after John Barton Payne, the counsel for the Emergency Fleet Corporation during World War I, Chairman of the U.S. Shipping Board from 1919 until February 1920, and the United States Secretary of the Interior under Woodrow Wilson.

Construction
John Barton Payne was laid down on 11 August 1943, under a Maritime Commission (MARCOM) contract, MC hull 1535, by J.A. Jones Construction, Panama City, Florida; she was launched on 23 October 1943.

History
She was allocated to Isthmian Steamship Co., on 30 November 1943. On 21 November 1947, she was laid up in the National Defense Reserve Fleet, in Mobile, Alabama. On 28 October 1971, she was sold, along with 13 other ships, for $513,800, to Union Minerals and Alloys Corporation, to be scrapped. She was removed from the fleet on 22 February 1972.

References

Bibliography

 
 
 
 

 

Liberty ships
Ships built in Panama City, Florida
1943 ships
Mobile Reserve Fleet